1460 Haltia, provisional designation , is a stony background asteroid from the central regions of the asteroid belt, approximately 8 kilometers in diameter. It was discovered on 24 November 1937, by Finnish astronomer Yrjö Väisälä at the Iso-Heikkilä Observatory in Turku, Finland. The asteroid was named after Halti (Haltia), Finland's highest peak on the border to Norway.

Orbit and classification 

Haltia is a non-family asteroid of the main belt's background population. It orbits the Sun in the central asteroid belt at a distance of 2.1–3.0 AU once every 4 years and 1 month (1,481 days). Its orbit has an eccentricity of 0.19 and an inclination of 7° with respect to the ecliptic. The body's observation arc begins with its official discovery observation at Turku.

Physical characteristics 

Haltia is an assumed stony S-type asteroid.

Rotation period 

Two rotational lightcurves of Haltia were obtained from photometric observations by astronomers Henk de Groot, Raoul Behrend and René Roy. Lightcurve analysis gave a respective rotation period of 3.58682 and 3.588 hours with a brightness amplitude of 0.32 magnitude. The Lightcurve Data Base adopts a consolidated period of 3.59 hours.

Diameter and albedo 

According to the surveys carried out by the Japanese Akari satellite and the NEOWISE mission of NASA's Wide-field Infrared Survey Explorer, Haltia measures between 6.57 and 8.44 kilometers in diameter and its surface has an albedo between 0.186 and 0.36.

The Collaborative Asteroid Lightcurve Link assumes a standard albedo for stony asteroids of 0.20 and calculates a diameter of 8.97 based on an absolute magnitude of 12.6.

Naming 

This minor planet was named after Halti (Haltia), the highest Finnish peak at  located on the border between Norway and Finland. The official  was published by the Minor Planet Center on 20 February 1976.

References

External links 
 Asteroid Lightcurve Database (LCDB), query form (info )
 Dictionary of Minor Planet Names, Google books
 Asteroids and comets rotation curves, CdR – Observatoire de Genève, Raoul Behrend
 Discovery Circumstances: Numbered Minor Planets (1)-(5000) – Minor Planet Center
 
 

001460
Discoveries by Yrjö Väisälä
Named minor planets
19371124